Useless invention may refer to:
An invention that is nonpatentable due to its lack of utility
Chindōgu
Useless machine
Rube Goldberg invention